Christian Chirieletti (born 2 March 1988) is an Italian football right defender who plays for Civitavecchia. In 2015 he had his only experience outside Italy playing in Romania for Liga I club Ceahlăul Piatra Neamț.

Honours
Salernitana
Lega Pro Seconda Divisione: 2012–13
Serie D: 2011–12

References

1988 births
Living people
Italian footballers
Association football defenders
Serie D players
Liga I players
S.S.D. Sanremese Calcio players
U.S. Salernitana 1919 players
CSM Ceahlăul Piatra Neamț players
L'Aquila Calcio 1927 players
A.S.D. Civitavecchia 1920 players
Italian expatriate footballers
Expatriate footballers in Romania
Italian expatriate sportspeople in Romania
Footballers from Rome
A.S.D. Fanfulla players